The 1982 Texas A&M Aggies football team represented Texas A&M University in the 1982 NCAA Division I-A football season as a member of the Southwest Conference (SWC). The Aggies were led by head coach Jackie Sherrill in his first season and finished with a record of five wins and six losses (5–6 overall, 3–5 in the SWC).

Schedule

Roster
QB Gary Kubiak, Sr.

References

Texas AandM Aggies
Texas A&M Aggies football seasons
Texas AandM Aggies football